Martha Coffin Wright  (December 25, 1806 – 1875) was an American feminist, abolitionist, and signatory of the Declaration of Sentiments who was a close friend and supporter of Harriet Tubman.

Early life
Martha Coffin was born in Boston, Massachusetts on Christmas Day 1806, the youngest child of Anna Folger and Thomas Coffin, a merchant and former Nantucket ship captain. Martha was the youngest of eight children. Some of her well-known siblings were Sarah, Lucretia, Eliza, Mary, and Thomas. All of her siblings were born in Nantucket. When she was two years old, the family moved to Philadelphia, where Martha was educated at Quaker schools. Her father died in 1815, at the age of 48, of typhus. Martha was influenced by her elder sisters and her mother. Martha's eldest sister Anna was a huge influence on her; she was the one who sent Martha to the Westtown School in 1821. This was the same school that three of her siblings attended 10 years earlier. After spending 15 years in Philadelphia Martha moved to Aurora, New York, in the Finger Lakes country, in November 1827.

Career

Seneca Falls Convention
Martha's older sister Lucretia Coffin Mott was a prominent Quaker preacher. In July 1848, she visited Martha's home in Auburn, New York. During that visit, Martha and Lucretia met with Elizabeth Cady Stanton at Jane Hunt's house and decided to hold a convention in nearby Seneca Falls, New York, to discuss the need for greater rights for women.

The importance of the Seneca Falls Convention, the first women's rights convention, was recognized by Congress in 1980 with the creation of the Women's Rights National Historical Park at the site, administered by the National Park Service. The Park's Visitor Center today features a group of life-size bronze statues to honor the women and men who in 1848 initiated the organized movement for women's rights and woman suffrage. Her statue shows her, as she was then, visibly pregnant. In 2005, the park featured a display about the relationship between Lucretia and Martha. In 2008, the park featured a display focused on Martha.

Women's rights and abolitionism

After the Seneca Falls Convention Martha Wright participated in a number of state conventions and the annual National Women's Rights Conventions in various capacities, often serving as President. She was also active in the abolition movement. The arguments for women's rights had much in common with the arguments for abolition. With her sister Lucretia, Martha attended the founding meeting of the American Anti-Slavery Society in Philadelphia in 1833.

In September 1852, Martha attended a convention in Syracuse, NY where she gave her first speech on women's rights. This very convention was where she was first introduced to Susan B. Anthony. Martha attended many conventions and lectures all the way until 1862, when the Civil War occurred. She felt it would be best to focus on the war. She still continued her fight for the American Anti-Slavery Society.

Underground Railroad
Martha's home in Auburn, New York, was part of the Underground Railroad where she harbored fugitive slaves. She became a close friend and supporter of Harriet Tubman. Martha and her husband David were influential in the movement to abolish slavery, and they shared this common interest with their close friends in Auburn, NY, the Seward family. William Henry Seward at the time was the elected governor of New York State. Seward's wife Frances Seward and his sister Lazette Worden became interested in the works of the Women's Right movement, but never actively were involved.

Auburn, NY Home

In 1839 the Wright family moved to 192 Genesee Street Auburn, NY. The house was very large and close to the courthouse. This was key for her husband David's career as a lawyer. The house would be a key part in housing slaves and important figures during the women's movement. Examples of such slaves  and important figures were Frederick Douglass, William Lloyd Garrison, Elizabeth Cady Stanton, and Susan B. Anthony.

Personal life
In 1824, Martha married Captain Peter Pelham (1785-1826) of Kentucky and moved with him to a frontier fort at Tampa Bay, Florida. They had a daughter. Peter died in July 1826, leaving Martha a nineteen-year-old widow with an infant child. She moved to upstate New York to teach painting and writing at a Quaker school for girls. Martha had six children, Marianna (whom she had with her first husband), Tallman, Eliza, Ellen, William, and Francis. After the death of her husband in 1826 she met a man by the name of Julius Catlin and continued to see him. In 1828, they both expressed their wish to become engaged and married. Yet, nothing ever came of the relationship because Julius's father did not approve of Martha and he met an early death in 1828. This was not the end of Martha's love life. In 1829, she met a man by the name of David Wright, a lawyer, and they were soon married; on November 18. David Wright was a Quaker just like Martha and was born and raised in Bucks County, Pennsylvania.

Martha's daughter Ellen Wright (1840–1931) was an advocate of women's rights, especially women's suffrage. In 1864, she married William Lloyd Garrison, Jr. (1838–1909), a prominent advocate of Henry George's single tax movement, free trade, woman's suffrage, and of the repeal of the Chinese Exclusion Act. William was the son of abolitionist William Lloyd Garrison.

Death
Martha Coffin Wright died on January 4, 1875. She is buried in Fort Hill Cemetery in Auburn, New York.

Descendants
Martha's granddaughter, Eleanor Garrison (1880–1974), the daughter of her daughter Ellen and her husband William, worked for the National American Woman Suffrage Association.

Recognition
On October 9, 2007, House resolution 588 entitled "Recognizing Martha Coffin Wright on the 200th anniversary of her birth and her induction into the National Women's Hall of Fame" passed in the U.S. House of Representatives.

References

External links
UMass Biography of Martha Coffin Wright
 Biography of Martha Coffin Wright
Smith College page on the Wright-Garrison Families including a photo of Martha in middle of page
Women's Letters, 2005, Dial Press, Pages 165–8, Letter from Martha Coffin Wright to Lucretia Mott
Video on Martha Wright
House resolution 588 recognizing her

Bibliography
National Historic Park of New York. (n.d.). Martha C. Wright. Retrieved November 28, 2016, from https://www.nps.gov/wori/learn/historyculture/marthacwright.htm 
National Women's Hall of Fame. (2016). Martha Coffin Pelham Wright. Retrieved from https://www.womenofthehall.org/inductee/marthacoffinpelhamwright/
Penney, Sherry H. and Livingstone, James D. A Very Dangerous Woman: Martha Wright and Women's Rights. University of Massachusetts Press, 2004. .
Penney, S. H., & Livingston, J. D. (n.d.). Expectant at Senecca Falls. Retrieved November 28, 2016, from http://womhist.alexanderstreet.com/mcw/append.htm

American suffragists
American women's rights activists
American feminists
People from Boston
People from Auburn, New York
American Quakers
1806 births
1875 deaths
Underground Railroad people
Westtown School alumni
Activists from New York (state)
Activists from Philadelphia
Quaker abolitionists
Quaker feminists
Women civil rights activists